Sex, Money and Hip-Hop is the second studio album by rapper and Slaughterhouse member KXNG CROOKED (also known as Crooked I). The album was released on December 16, 2014  and it was executive produced by KXNG CROOKED himself along with Mike Smith and Jonathan Hay.

Background

On November 15, 2014 during the Shady Cypher for Shady XV, Crooked I officially announced that he was changing his name to Kxng Crooked for his upcoming release Sex, Money and Hip-Hop an album that he described as a "mixtape experience". On November 20 the first single "Freestylin' Under Oath" was released.
Billboard reported on December 2 that Slaughterhouse would appear on the album with the song "Total Slaughter". On December 5, MTV News exclusively released the song "I Can't Breathe" to raise awareness for Eric Garner. On December 15, "An Open Letter To The Internet" was released asking the fans to not leak the album online.

On January 13, 2015 the video for "I Can't Breathe" was released to promote Sex, Money and Hip-Hop. The album was released on iTunes on February 26, 2016 through Smith and Hay / Urban Hitchcock.

Track listing

Original album

Remastered album

References

2014 albums